Hispano-Suiza piston aero-engines were predominantly piston engines produced by Hispano-Suiza in France, Spain, and under licence in the United Kingdom, the United States and Russia from the First World War through to the 1950s. Development of these engines started with the very successful V-8 engines which introduced many new features which ensured the success of the Hispano-Suiza line.

Designations

Letter system
The Service technique de l'aéronautique (STAé) used a common designation system for the vast majority of engines produced in France, which signified the major attributes of the particular engines:-
 Manufacturer - In this case Hispano-Suiza
 12 - the number of cylinders in any configuration (V, straight, W, horizontally opposed, radial, etc.).
 Y - the family letter in capitals (note: in at least two instances the family designator consisted of two letters in capitals e.g. 14AA and 14AB), advancing alphabetically. (note:Hispano-Suiza avoided W to avoid confusion with W / Broad-arrow engines)
 a – sub variant indicator, (which could also indicate the rotation of the engine, where otherwise identical engines with opposite hand rotation were built, e.g. 12Ndr anti-clockwise and 12Nfr clockwise).
 r – attribute indicators, denoting various attributes that the engine might have, (r = reduction gearing, i = fuel injection, s = supercharged, etc.)
 1 - sub-sub variants were denoted by using a number after the letters, (e.g. 12Xhrs and 12Xhrs1), usually indicating differences in ancillary equipment.

Thus the 12Xgrs was of the X family, with reduction gearing and supercharger, whereas the 12Xhrs was identical but rotated in the opposite direction.

Number system
The STAé introduced a numbered attribute indicator from the late 1930s, thus;

12Y-26, 12Y-27 – left and right rotation versions of the same engine.

Basic versions of each engine had even numbers and opposite rotation version were odd numbered.

List of H-S piston aero-engines
Data from:Moteurs d'Aviation Hispano-Suiza

Livre d'Or de la Société Française Hispano-Suiza

Hispano-Suiza:Revue et Bulletin Technique de la Société Française Hispano-Suiza Jun 28

Hispano-Suiza:Revue et Bulletin Technique de la Société Française Hispano-Suiza Jan 28

Hispano-Suiza:Revue et Bulletin Technique de la Société Française Hispano-Suiza Nov 29

Hispano-Suiza:Revue et Bulletin Technique de la Société Française Hispano-Suiza Dec 30

Hispano-Suiza:Revue et Bulletin Technique de la Société Française Hispano-Suiza Jun 30

Hispano-Suiza:Revue et Bulletin Technique de la Société Française Hispano-Suiza Nov 31

Hispano-Suiza:Revue et Bulletin Technique de la Société Française Hispano-Suiza Apr 32

Hispano-Suiza:Revue et Bulletin Technique de la Société Française Hispano-Suiza Oct 32

Hispano-Suiza:Revue et Bulletin Technique de la Société Française Hispano-Suiza Jan-Jun 35

Le moteur-canon V8 Hispano-Suiza

HISPANO-SUIZA:LES MOTEURS DE TOUS LES RECORDS

Aviafrance 

5Q

6M
6Mb
6Mbr

6P
6Pa

8A
8Aa
8Ab

8B
8Ba
8Bb
8Bc
8Bd
8Be
8Bec

8C
8Cb

8F
8Fa
8Fb
8Fe

9Q
9Qa
9Qb
9Qc
9Qd
9Qdr

9T
Produced under licence from Clerget, derived from the Clerget 9C, diesel radial engine.

9V
9Vr
9Vb
9Vbr
9Vbrs
9Vbs
9Vd
9V-10
9V-11
9V-16
9V-17

12B (1945)

12F
12Fd

12G (Type 50)
12Ga
12Gb

12H (Type 51)
12Ha
12Hb
12Hbr
12Hbxr

12J (Type 52)
12Ja
12Jb

12K
Kb
Kbrs

12L
Lb
Lbr
Lbxr

12M(Type 57)
12Mb/500
12Mb/500r
12Mc/500
12Mcr/500
12Md
12Mdr
12Mdsh

12N (Type 61)
12Nb/650
12Nbr/650
12Nbrs/650
12Nc
12cNr:
12Ndr
12Ner
12Nfr
12Ngr
12Ns
12Nsr
12Ns Special
12Nsr Special

12X
 (Type 72)
12Xbr
12Xbrs
12Xbrg
12Xbr
12Xbrs
12Xbrs1
12Xdrs
12Xfrs
12Xgrs
12Xgrs1
12Xhrs
12Xhrs1
12Xirs
12Xjrs
(Type 76) with  calibre Hispano-Suiza HS.404 cannon between cylinder banks, firing through propeller shaft.
12Xcrs
12Xers
12Xirs
12Xjrs
12Xirs1
12Xjrs1
12X-13

12Y(Type 73)
12Ybr
12Ybrg
12Ybrs1
12Ygrs
12Ydr
12Ydrs
12Ydrs1
12Ydrs2
12Yfrs
12Yfrs1
12Yfrs2
12Y-21
12Y-25
12Y-26
12Y-27
12Y-28
12Y-29
12Y-38
12Y-39
(Type 77) with 20 mm Hispano-Suiza HS.404 cannon between cylinder banks, firing through propeller shaft.
12Ybrs
12Ycrs
12Y-28
12Y-29
12Y-30
12Y-31
12Y-32
12Y-33
12Y-36
12Y-37
12Y-41
12Y-45
12Y-47
12Y 49
12Y-50
12Y-51

12Z
(Type 89)
12Z-1
12Z-17
12Z-89

14AA(Type 79)
14AA-00
14AA-01
14AA-02
14AA-03
14AA-04
14AA-05
14AA-06
14AA-07

14AB
14AB-12
14AB-13

14H
14Ha-7a
14Hbs
14Hbrs

14U
Produced under licence from Clerget, derived from the Clerget 14F, diesel radial engine.

Hispano Suiza 400hp V-16 

Hispano Suiza 600hp V-16 

18R

18S
18Sb
18Sbr

24Y (Types 82 and 90)

24Z (Type 95)

36Y

48H

48Z

Whirlwind

Abadal 12Y(HS 8 with a third inverted vertical bank)  at 2,500 rpm, with reduction gear, weighing .

Hispano-Suiza in-house Type designations
Data from:

The Hispano-Suiza Type numbers were used for all Hispano-Suiza products, including cars trucks and engines: Types 21, 22 and 23 are known to have been cars.

Type 31 Prototype, (bxs ), with mixed cooling (11 fins) and initial production 8A, (bxs ), with 8 cooling fins, 1,450 rpm, .

Type 34 8Aa, 1800 rpm, 4.7:1 compression, 100% water-cooling.

Type 34-S (S for surcomprimé) 8Ab, 1800 rpm, 5.3:1 compression, 100% water-cooling.

Type 35 8B, 2,000 rpm, geared.

Type 35-S  (S for surcomprimé) 8B, 2,000 rpm, high compression, geared.

Type 36 8B with Lewis gun

Type 38 8BeC, Type 36 with a modified  SAMC Model 37 cannon

Type 39 Coupled  engines

Type 40 (8E ?)

Type 41 (8A ?)

Type 42 8Fb, (bxs ),  at 1,800 rpm.

Type 42VS 8Fe

Type 43 cannon equipped project

Type 44 A later, little used, moteur-canon version.

Type 45  cannon

Type 50 12G

Type 51 12H

Type 52 12J

Type 57 12M

Type 61 12N

Type 72 12X

Type 73 12Y

Type 76 12X with cannon

Type 77 12Y with cannon

Type 79 14AA

Type 82 24Y

Type 89 12Z

Type 90 24Y

Type 95 24Z

Type 96 48Z

Specifications
Data from:
This table gives the major attributes of each engine model, where known.

Applications and chronology

References

Aircraft piston engines
Hispano-Suiza aircraft engines